Seminemacheilus is a genus of stone loaches native to western Asia with species known from Turkey and Iran.

Species 
There are currently two recognized species in this genus:
 Seminemacheilus ispartensis Erk'akan, Nalbant & Özeren, 2007
 Seminemacheilus lendlii (Hankó, 1925) (Anatolian loach)
 Seminemacheilus ahmeti (Sungur, Jalili, Eagderi & Çiçek 2018) (Ahmeti loach)

References 

 
Fish of Asia
Taxa named by Petre Mihai Bănărescu
Taxa named by Teodor T. Nalbant
Taxonomy articles created by Polbot